Cleopatra is a 1928 MGM silent fictionalized film, shot in two-color Technicolor. It was the sixth short produced as part of Metro-Goldwyn-Mayer's "Great Events" series.

Plot summary

Cast
 Dorothy Revier as Cleopatra
 Robert Ellis as Marc Antony
 Serge Temoff		
 Will Walling
 Ben Hendricks Jr. as Octavius Caesar
 Evelyn Selbie as Charmian

Production
The film was shot at the Tec-Art Studio in Hollywood.

Preservation Status
A complete print of this film was preserved in 1993 by Cinema Arts Laboratory was is held by the George Eastman House.

References

External links 
 

1928 films
American silent short films
Metro-Goldwyn-Mayer short films
Silent films in color
Films set in ancient Egypt
Depictions of Cleopatra on film
Depictions of Julius Caesar on film
Depictions of Mark Antony on film
Films shot in Los Angeles
1920s American films